The dean of the House is, in some legislatures, the member with the longest unbroken record of service. Specific examples include:

 Dean of the United States House of Representatives, currently Hal Rogers since 2022
 Dean of the House (Canada), currently Louis Plamondon since 2008

References

See also 
 Dean of the United States Senate
 Father of the House, the equivalent in other legislatures
 Father of the Dáil, the equivalent in Dáil Éireann